The 1988 Scotland rugby union tour of Zimbabwe was a series of five matches played by the Scotland national rugby union team in Zimbabwe in May 1988. The Scotland team won all five of their matches including the two internationals against the Zimbabwe national rugby union team.

Matches 
Scores and results list Scotland's points tally first.

Touring party

Manager: J. B. Steven
Coach: Richie Dixon
Assistant coach: David Johnston
Captain: Peter Dods

Backs
Peter Dods
Ian Ramsey
Matt Duncan
Stewart McAslan
Ruari McLean
Alex Moore
Derek Stark
Douglas Wyllie
Colin Gass
Craig Chalmers
Richard Cramb
G. MacGregor

Forwards
Paul Burnell
David Butcher
George Graham
C. Brown
Jim Hay
Damian Cronin
Chris Gray
Jeremy Richardson
D. Leckie
Sean McGaughey
Hugh Parker
Kevin Rafferty
Derek Turnbull

Notes

References

Scotland rugby union tour
Scotland national rugby union team tours
Rugby union tours of Zimbabwe
tour